Aarón Castellanos (August 8, 1799 – April 1, 1880) was an Argentine businessman and military commander. He founded the city of Esperanza in the Santa Fe Province. A locality bearing his name, is also named after him.

1799 births
1880 deaths
People from Salta
Argentine nobility
Argentine businesspeople
Argentine military personnel
19th-century Argentine people